Niall O'Brien (2 August 1939 in Dublin, Ireland – 27 April 2004 in Pisa, Italy) was an Irish Columban missionary priest, notable for being falsely accused of and detained in the Philippines in the 1980s on charges of multiple murder. He was ordained a priest in December 1963.

Ilonggo bible
Having spent some years learning the Hiligaynon language on the island of Negros, Father O'Brien helped translate the first Vatican-approved Hiligaynon version of the bible.

Revolutionary activities
In the 1970s, while posted in the mountain village of Tabugon, Kabankalan City, Negros Occidental, he formed a workers' co-operative, which he called a kibbutz. As Negros was largely a feudal society, with power concentrated in the hands of a few landowners with the support of the military, this action led to him being branded a communist by the authorities.

Arrest for multiple murders
On 6 May 1983, he was arrested along with two other priests, Fr. Brian Gore, an Australian, Fr. Vicente Dangan, a Filipino and six lay workers – the so-called "Negros Nine", for the murders of Mayor Pablo Sola of Kabankalan and four companions. The priests were held under house arrest for eight months but "escaped" to prison in Bacolod, the provincial capital, where they felt they would be safer.

The case received widespread publicity in Ireland and Australia, the home of one of the co-accused priests, Fr. Brian Gore. Charlie Bird interviewed Fr. O'Brien in his overcrowded prison cell on RTÉ TV. He was defended together with the rest of the Negros Nine by attorneys Bobbit Sanchez and Senator Jose W. Diokno of the Free Legal Assistance Group (FLAG). When US Pres. Ronald Reagan visited Ireland in 1984, he was asked on Irish TV how he could help the missionary priest's situation. A phone call the next day from the Reagan administration to Ferdinand Marcos resulted in Marcos offering a pardon to Fr. O'Brien and his co-accused.

Exile and return
Rather than accept a pardon, which would imply guilt, the priests had the charges dropped against them in return for agreeing to leave the country. They were released on 3 July 1984. Fr. O'Brien made a promise to himself and his God that, if he should return home safely, he would perform the ancient pilgrimage to Croagh Patrick, which he did at the end of July 1984.

In 1986, the Marcos regime fell in the People Power revolution and Fr. O'Brien returned to the country he considered home shortly afterwards.

Death
He died in Pisa, Italy on 28 April 2004, aged 64, from an accidental fall while suffering from myelofibrosis.

Books by Fr. O'Brien
Revolution from the Heart
Seeds of Injustice
Island of Tears

References

External links
http://www.preda.org/archives/2004/r04050101.html
https://web.archive.org/web/20070312080330/http://www.preda.org/archives/2004/r04050202.html
Fr Niall O'Brien: Champion of the Poor Philippines Inquirer News Service

1939 births
2004 deaths
Missionary Society of St. Columban